Aspergillus pisci is a species of fungus in the genus Aspergillus.

References

pisci
Fungi described in 2014